Songdo International Business District (Songdo IBD) is a smart city built on  of reclaimed land along Incheon's waterfront,  southwest of Seoul, South Korea. It is connected to Incheon International Airport by a  reinforced concrete highway bridge called Incheon Bridge. Along with Yeongjong and Cheongna, it is part of the Incheon Free Economic Zone.

The Songdo International Business District will feature the Northeast Asia Trade Tower, G-tower, and the Incheon Tower. Schools, hospitals, apartments, office buildings and cultural amenities are to be built in the district. Homages of architectural hallmarks, including New York City's Central Park and Venice's waterways, will also be incorporated. This 10-year development project is estimated to cost in excess of $40 billion, making it one of the most expensive development projects ever undertaken.

With 106 buildings and 22 million square ft. of LEED-certified space, the green building certification by the United States Green Building Council, Songdo IBD makes up about 40% of all LEED-certified space in South Korea.

As of 2020, the population of Songdo exceeds 167,346 people.

Ownership and design 
Gale International holds a majority stake of 61%, Posco holds 30%, and the remaining 9% is owned by Morgan Stanley Real Estate. The plan was designed by the New York office of Kohn Pedersen Fox (KPF). Infrastructure development, labor, and funding are also being provided by the city of Incheon.

Development

The 65-floor Northeast Asia Trade Tower became South Korea's tallest building. Computers have been built into the houses, streets, and offices as part of a wide area network.

The Songdo IBD was part of former President Lee Myung-bak's effort to promote green and low-carbon growth as an avenue for future development after 60 years of reliance on export-oriented manufacturing. The nation launched a $38 billion economic stimulus package in January 2009, with over 80% of the total earmarked for green investment. The Framework Act for Low Carbon Green Growth, passed by Korea's National Assembly in 2010, increased this to $83.6 billion spanning five years. Also, it is the first district in Korea to have all of its major buildings on par or beyond LEED's requirements.

The schools will be funded by the Ministry of Knowledge Economy, the Incheon Free Economic Zone and the Incheon Metropolitan Government. The development is part of a $35 billion effort by the Korean government to form an international business district that houses competitive universities from around the world. In spring 2014, George Mason University (Fairfax, Virginia) opened its Korean campus in Songdo to support undergraduate academic interests and professional development programming for local corporations. Additionally, University of Utah anticipated opening a satellite campus in March 2014 with several American bachelor's degrees offered in Social Sciences, along with an M.A. in Applied Linguistics

Sustainability
Though the city is not yet complete, Songdo IBD is home to 106 LEED certified buildings that fall under 12 projects, or 22 million sq ft of LEED-certified space. This number includes several ‘firsts’ for LEED in Korea and Asia, including the first LEED-certified hotel in Korea (the Sheraton Incheon), the first certified residential tower in Korea (Central Park 1), and the first certified convention hall in Asia (Convensia). The 50,000 sq ft clubhouse for the Jack Nicklaus Golf Club Korea which hosted the Presidents Cup in 2015 is also certified. Songdo IBD alone represents 40% of all LEED-certified space in South Korea.

In addition, Songdo IBD utilizes a pneumatic waste disposal system. This means no garbage cans on street corners, and no garbage trucks. Instead, garbage is thrown into pipes that will suck the garbage underground, disposing of waste, and recycling what can be recycled.

There are also 25 km of bike paths and charging stations for electric vehicles throughout the city.

UN Green Climate Fund
In October 2012, Songdo IBD was selected to become the home to the United Nations Green Climate Fund (GCF). One of the reasons for selection is the environmental-friendly practices that were incorporated into the city's foundation. Being selected for the GCF marked the first time a large global environmental agency would be hosted in Asia.

A parallel between The GCF and the World Bank can be drawn, as The GCF offers financial aid to developing countries in their quest to combat climate change. South Korea beat out 5 other competitors for this opportunity, as part of former South Korean President Lee Myung-Bak's initiative for green growth in Korea. The other competing countries were Germany, Switzerland, Mexico, Namibia, and Poland. According to Chief Secretary Kim Sang-hyup, the win for selection came at only 10 days before the decision was due, and mainly because the United States decided to lend its support to Korea.

Transportation
Songdo IBD has wide roads and a high number of bicycle paths and walkways. The district is served by buses and by Incheon Metro Line 1, with six stations (another will be added in 2021), some with elegant interiors and interior sky-lit vistas. Although travel to Incheon International Airport is quick with the 12.3 km Incheon Bridge, transportation via subway to Seoul is less direct and requires multiple transfers but two Red class commuter buses offer direct routes to the capital city.

Environmental impact
In 2003, Birds Korea called for a halt to the reclamation project due to concerns of potential losses of important tidal flats. Prior to reclamation, the Songdo tidal flats had supported several threatened waterbird species, and provided a staging ground for migratory waders as they traveled between the Northern and Southern hemispheres.

Popular culture
 Songdo International Business District was heavily featured in episodes 68 and 81 of the South Korean variety show Running Man, filmed in 2011 and 2012, respectively. It also provided the backdrop for the music video for "Gangnam Style" and "Right Now", by Korean pop star Psy.
 The city is featured in the 2021 video game Battlefield 2042 as the main setting of multiplayer map Kaleidoscope.

Projects

 State University of New York (SUNY) – Korea (SBU, FIT)
 George Mason University Korea Campus
 Ghent University Global Campus
 University of Utah Asia Campus
 Yonsei University, International Campus
 Global Information Complex, Inha University
 Chadwick International
 First World
 Jack Nicklaus Golf Club Korea
 Northeast Asia Trade Tower
 Sheraton Incheon Hotel
 Songdo Canal Walk
 Songdo Convensia
 Songdo Central Park
 University of Incheon

Gallery

Songdo International City seen from Gyeonggi Province

References

External links

New Island Hopes to Be Hong Kong Of Korea, New York Times September 24, 2004.
 Inha Global Knowledge Complex @ Songdo International Business District

 
New towns in South Korea
Redeveloped ports and waterfronts in South Korea
Artificial islands of South Korea
Internal territorial disputes of South Korea
New towns started in the 2010s
Smart cities